The 2003 Tipperary Senior Hurling Championship was the 113th staging of the Tipperary Senior Hurling Championship since its establishment by the Tipperary County Board in 1887. The championship began on 31 August 2003 and ended on 12 October 2003.

Mullinahone were the defending champions.

On 12 October 2003, Toomevara won the title after a 3-19 to 3-16 defeat of Thurles Sarsfields in the final  at Semple Stadium. It was their 18th championship title overall and their first title in two years.

References

External links
 Senior Hurling Championship 2003

Tipperary Senior Hurling Championship
Tipperary